Braunshausen is a village and a civil parish (Ortsteil) of the German town of Hallenberg, located in the Hochsauerlandkreis district in North Rhine-Westphalia. As of 2010 its population was of 350.

History
The village was founded in 1474. As the two other Ortsteil of Hallenberg Braunshausen was, until 1974, an autonomous municipality belonging to the former District of Brilon and to the Amt Hallenberg.

Geography
Braunshausen is located in the south-eastern corner of the Hochsauerlandkreis, close to the borders with Hesse and to Rengershausen, a village belonging to the town of Frankenberg. It is 4,5 km far from Hallenberg.

See also
Hallenberg
Liesen
Hesborn

References

External links
 Hallenberg municipal website

Villages in North Rhine-Westphalia
Hallenberg
Populated places established in the 1470s
1474 establishments in Europe
15th-century establishments in the Holy Roman Empire